The Roman Catholic Diocese of Yuanling is a Latin Rite diocese located in the county of Yuanling (Hunan) in the Ecclesiastical province of Changsha in China, yet depends on the missionary Roman Congregation for the Evangelization of Peoples. No statistics available.

It is vacant since 1968, but has an Apostolic administrator since 2012.

History 
 Established on 13 March 1925 as the Apostolic Prefecture of Chenzhou  辰州 (中文) / Shenchow / de Shenchow (Latin), on territory split off from the then Apostolic Vicariate of Changde 常德 (now a diocese)
 Promoted on 28 May 1934 as Apostolic Vicariate of Chenzhou 辰州
 Renamed on 10 December 1934 as Apostolic Vicariate of Yuanling 沅陵
 Promoted on 11 April 1946 as Diocese of Yuanling 沅陵 (中文) / Chenzhou 辰州 (中文) / Shen-Chou / Yüanlíng / Iüen-limen(sis) (Latin)

Ordinaries 
(all Roman rite, so far members of Latin congregations)

 Apostolic Prefects of Chenzhou 辰州 )
 Father Domenico Langenbacher, Passionists (C.P.) C.P. (born USA) (16 July 1925 – 1929)
 Fr. Cutbert Martin O'Gara, C.P. (born Canada) (12 February 1930 – 28 May 1934 see below)

 Apostolic Vicar of Yuanling 沅陵 
 Cutbert Martin O'Gara, C.P. (see above 28 May 1934 – 11 April 1946 see below), Titular Bishop of Elis (1934.05.28 – 1946.04.11)
 Suffragan Bishops of Yuanling 沅陵 
 Cutbert Martin O'Gara, C.P. (see above 11 April 1946 – death 13 May 1968)
'' Apostolic Administrator Methodius Qu Ai-lin (屈藹林) (2012 – ...), while Metropolitan Archbishop of Changsha 長沙 (2012 - ...); also Apostolic Administrator of its three suffragan dioceses Changde, Yuanling and Hengzhou 衡州, Apostolic Administrator of Apostolic Prefecture of Lixian 澧縣, Apostolic Administrator of Apostolic Prefecture of Yongzhou 永州, Apostolic Administrator of Apostolic Prefecture of Yueyang 岳陽, Apostolic Administrator of Apostolic Prefecture of Xiangtan 湘潭, Apostolic Administrator of Apostolic Prefecture of Baoqing 寶慶 (all PR China, all 2012 - ...).

References

Sources and external links 
 GCatholic.org - data for all sections
 Catholic Hierarchy

Roman Catholic dioceses in China
Christianity in Hunan
Yuanling County
Religious organizations established in 1925
Roman Catholic dioceses and prelatures established in the 20th century